P. Kumar Vasudev was the director of the Indian TV Series Hum Log, broadcast on DD1 (Doordarshan). It was India's first soap opera and the first serial drama series in the Indian sub-continent and Asia.

Death 
Kumar Vasudev died in Pune, India, on October 31, 1998, following a brief illness.  He is survived by his wife and three daughters.

Filmography

Citations

Indian television directors